Fananu is a island and municipality in the state of Chuuk, Federated States of Micronesia.

Fananu island is also located in Nomwin atoll north from Nomwin island. 

Together Nomwin , Fananu , Murilo & Ruo forms the Hall islands in Chuuk, Federated states of Micronesia.

The Hall islands along with Namonuito islands and Pattiw (Western islands) are considered Northwest outer islands in Chuuk State.

References
Statoids.com, retrieved December 8, 2010

Municipalities of Chuuk State